Peter Schwartz(e) or Schwarz may refer to:
 Peter Nigri (1434–1480s), 15th century Thomist from Kaaden
 Peter Schwartz (writer) (born 1949), writer and journalist
 Peter Schwartz (futurist) (born 1946), futurist and co-founder of GBN
 Peter Schwartze (born 1931), German scientist
 Peter Schwarz (born 1953), German football (soccer) player
 Peter Carl Ludwig Schwarz, astronomer
 Peter Schwarz, Australian rules footballer who played in the 1994 SANFL Grand Final